Wesley Ray Helms (born May 12, 1976) is an American former professional baseball player. During his 13-year playing career, Helms played for the Atlanta Braves, Milwaukee Brewers, Florida Marlins, and Philadelphia Phillies. He played primarily as a third baseman and first baseman. Helms also served as the manager of the Charlotte Knights, the Triple-A affiliate of the Chicago White Sox. His uncle Tommy Helms also played in the MLB from 1964 to 1967.

Professional career
The Atlanta Braves selected Helms in the 10th round of the 1994 Major League Baseball draft. He made his major league debut with the Braves on September 5, 1998. 

On December 16, 2002, the Braves traded Helms to the Milwaukee Brewers in exchange for Ray King. Following a successful first season with the Brewers, in which he hit 23 home runs and collected 67 RBI, he suffered a knee injury in a game against the Montreal Expos. After returning from the disabled list, he struggled to regain his previous form as well as playing time, being demoted to backup duties behind Russell Branyan.

On November 15, 2006, Helms agreed to a two-year, $5.5 million contract-in-principle with the Philadelphia Phillies, which included a club option for the third year. On April 2, 2008, he was designated for assignment by the Phillies, and three days later was traded to the Florida Marlins, in exchange for cash considerations. He was released by the Marlins on August 13, 2011. 

On August 17, 2011, he signed a minor league contract with the Atlanta Braves and was assigned to the Triple-A Gwinnett Braves. He was released by the Braves on September 1, 2011.

Coaching career
Helms was the bench coach of the Triple-A Lehigh Valley IronPigs for the 2018 season, followed by the Double-A Birmingham Barons for the 2019 season. In 2020, he was named manager of the Triple-A Charlotte Knights.

On May 20, 2022, the White Sox put Helms on an indefinite leave of absence from the Knights.

References

External links

Wes Helms at Baseball Almanac

1976 births
Living people
Atlanta Braves players
Baseball players from North Carolina
Durham Bulls players
Florida Marlins players
Gulf Coast Braves players
Greenville Braves players
Indianapolis Indians players
Macon Braves players
Major League Baseball first basemen
Major League Baseball third basemen
Milwaukee Brewers players
Navegantes del Magallanes players
American expatriate baseball players in Venezuela
People from Gastonia, North Carolina
Philadelphia Phillies players
Richmond Braves players
Baseball players from Atlanta
Tiburones de La Guaira players